Stumble into Grace is the twentieth studio album by American singer/songwriter Emmylou Harris, released on September 23, 2003 by Nonesuch Records. It peaked at No. 6 on the Billboard country albums chart. Like its immediate predecessor, Red Dirt Girl, the album contained a significant number of Harris' own compositions.

Track listing

Personnel
Emmylou Harris - vocals, acoustic guitar, 6-string bass guitar
Tony Hall - bass, guitar, backing vocals
Brady Blade - drums, backing vocals
Ethan Johns - drums, electric guitar
Julie Miller - backing vocals
Jane Siberry - backing vocals
Malcolm Burn - bass, electric guitar, piano, whistling, churanga, percussion, harmonica, Fender Rhodes, B2 organ, backing vocals
Buddy Miller - acoustic guitar, electric guitar
Kate McGarrigle - accordion, acoustic guitar, backing vocals
Anna McGarrigle - accordion, backing vocals
Daryl Johnson - percussion, bass, backing vocals
Daniel Lanois - pedal steel guitar, electronic orchestra, backing vocals
Bernie Leadon - electric guitar
Linda Ronstadt - backing vocals
Kevin Salem - electric guitar
Colin Linden - electric guitar
Gillian Welch - backing vocals
Jill Cunniff - backing vocals
Joe West - engineer

Charts

Weekly charts

Year-end charts

References

Emmylou Harris albums
2003 albums
Albums produced by Malcolm Burn
Nonesuch Records albums